Zakharov (masculine) or Zakharova (feminine or masculine genitive) is the name of several rural localities in Russia:
Zakharov, Krasnodar Krai, a khutor in Tverskoy Rural Okrug of Apsheronsky District of Krasnodar Krai
Zakharov, Chernyshkovsky District, Volgograd Oblast, a khutor in Zakharovsky Selsoviet of Chernyshkovsky District of Volgograd Oblast
Zakharov, Kletsky District, Volgograd Oblast, a khutor in Zakharovsky Selsoviet of Kletsky District of Volgograd Oblast
Zakharov, Kotelnikovsky District, Volgograd Oblast, a khutor in Zakharovsky Selsoviet of Kotelnikovsky District of Volgograd Oblast
Zakharova, Arkhangelsk Oblast, a village in Kenozersky Selsoviet of Plesetsky District of Arkhangelsk Oblast
Zakharova, Irkutsk Oblast, a village in Zhigalovsky District of Irkutsk Oblast
Zakharova, Perm Krai, a village in Kudymkarsky District of Perm Krai
Zakharova, Baykalovsky District, Sverdlovsk Oblast, a village in Baykalovsky District of Sverdlovsk Oblast
Zakharova, Verkhotursky District, Sverdlovsk Oblast, a village in Verkhotursky District of Sverdlovsk Oblast

Alternative names
Zakharova, alternative name of Zakharovo, a selo in Bezrukavsky Selsoviet of Rubtsovsky District in Altai Krai; 
Zakharova, alternative name of Zakharovo, a selo in Dumchevsky Selsoviet of Zalesovsky District in Altai Krai;